South Hills High School can refer to:

South Hills High School (West Covina, California)
South Hills High School (Texas) in Fort Worth, Texas
South Hills Catholic High School, a former school in Pittsburgh, Pennsylvania